Hypericum athoum is a perennial herb in the Hypericaceae family. It is endemic to Greece.

Description
Its flowers have 5 petals and its leaves are 8–15 mm long. The species's stem is 10-25 centimeters long, and its root system is that of a taproot.

References

athoum
Taxa named by Pierre Edmond Boissier
Taxa named by Theodoros G. Orphanides
Endemic flora of Greece